Joseph Edwards Jr. (November 11, 1737 – April 23, 1783) was a noted American silversmith, active in Boston.

Edwards was born into a distinguished family of Boston silversmiths. His grandfather, John Edwards (1671-1746), came to Boston in 1688; after his death, he was described in the Boston Evening-Post of April 14, 1746, as "John Edwards, goldsmith" and "a Gentleman of a very fair Character and well respected by all that knew him." Three of his sons - Joseph Edwards (1707-1777) senior, Samuel Edwards, and Thomas Edwards - also became silversmiths. The young Edwards appears to have apprenticed in the family, and advertised his own trade as early as 1758. According to a report in the Boston News-Letter of March 21, 1765, a thief broke into his shop and stole the following items: "34 pairs of wrought Silver Shoe Buckles, 20 pair of similar knee buckles, 6 pair of plain shoe buckles, 2 Silver Snuff Boxes, one with a Tortoise Shell Top, 9 Stock Buckles, 3 gold Necklaces, 5 gold Rings, several pair Stone Buttons, 3 pair brilliant Stone Earings, set in Gold, 5 pair gold cypher earings, several pair of silver cypher earings, several stone Rings; a Box of Gold Beads; 3 child’s Whistles; one pair of gold Buttons and 1 silver Pipe."

His work is collected in the Museum of Fine Arts, Boston, Metropolitan Museum of Art, Museum of Fine Arts, Houston, and Yale University Art Gallery.

References 
 American Silversmiths and Their Marks: The Definitive (1948) Edition, Stephen Guernsey Cook Ensko, Courier Corporation, 1983, page 50.
 American Silver of the XVII & XVIII Centuries: A Study Based on the Clearwater Collection, Alphonso Trumpbour Clearwater, Clara Louise Avery, Metropolitan Museum of Art, 1920, pages 79-80.
 "Joseph Edwards", American Silversmiths.
 "USA, regulated $15, Joseph Edwards plug and countermark", iCollector.
 Historic Silver of the Colonies and Its Makers, Francis Hill Bigelow, Macmillan, 1917, page 271.

American silversmiths
1737 births
1783 deaths